Lydia Dmitrievna Zinovieva-Annibal (1866–1907) was a Russian prose writer and dramatist. Annibal was her mother's maiden name.

Biography
She was born to a noble family. Her grandfather was Senator , her uncle was General  and her brother, A.D. Zinoviev became the Governor of Saint Petersburg. Her mother was the Baroness Weimar and a descendant of Abram Petrovich Gannibal.

Most of her education was from private tutors. She did attend the Saint Petersburg women's gymnasium for a short time, but was expelled for being "obstinate". In 1884, she married one of her tutors, Konstantin Shvarsalon. Under his influence, she developed an interest in socialism and became associated with the Narodniks. Clandestine meetings were often held at their home. 

In 1893, she fled to Rome, where she met the poet Vyacheslav Ivanov. Two years later, Ivanov divorced his wife, but her husband refused to consent and their divorce proceedings dragged on for three years. During the 1900s, after returning to Saint Petersburg, she and Ivanov hosted the literary salon "" (Ivanov Wednesdays, better known as "On the Tower", from its location).

She died of scarlet fever. Her grave at Nikolskoe Cemetery has been lost. In 1913, Ivanov married Lydia's daughter, Vera, from her marriage with Shvarsalon.  

Zinovieva-Annibal was associated with the Silver Age of Russian Poetry. Her short novel Tridsat'-tri uroda (Thirty-Three Abominations) was one of the few works of its day to openly discuss lesbianism.

Works
 Torches (1903)
 Rings (1904)
 Thirty-Three Abominations (1907) short novel. Transl. by S. D. Cioran in The Silver Age of Russian Culture.
 The Tragic Menagerie (1907) stories. Transl. by Jane T. Costlow, 1999, Northwestern University Press, 
 No!' (1918)

References

Further reading
 Bloomsbury Guide to Women's Literature P. Davidson, The Poetic Imagination of Viacheslav Ivanov''

1866 births
1907 deaths
Writers from Saint Petersburg
People from Sankt-Peterburgsky Uyezd
Russian dramatists and playwrights
Russian women dramatists and playwrights
Russian women novelists
Russian women short story writers
Bisexual women
Bisexual dramatists and playwrights
Russian bisexual people
Russian LGBT dramatists and playwrights
19th-century novelists from the Russian Empire
19th-century dramatists and playwrights from the Russian Empire
19th-century women writers from the Russian Empire
19th-century writers from the Russian Empire
19th-century short story writers from the Russian Empire
Deaths from streptococcus infection
Burials at Nikolskoe Cemetery